GoW4 may refer to:
 Gears of War 4, a 2016 video game for the Xbox One and Microsoft Windows
 God of War (2018 video game), a 2018 video game for the PlayStation 4, commonly referred to as God of War 4